"Poorhouse Rock" is the 22nd and final episode of the 33rd season of the American animated television series The Simpsons, and the 728th episode episode overall. It aired in the United States on Fox on May 22, 2022. The episode was directed by Jennifer Moeller and written by Tim Long.

Plot
On Saturday night, Marge sends Homer, Bart, Lisa and Maggie away to stop them from disrupting her girls' night with Sarah Wiggum, Bernice Hibbert, Miss Hoover and Luann Van Houten where they binge drink while watching Tunnelton. The next morning, a severely hungover Marge insists that Homer drive the kids to church in her place. In Sunday school, Bart shows his class a humiliating supercut of Homer acting out, causing Homer to fear that Bart does not respect him. He takes Bart to the power plant, where he is won over by the privileges and high pay that Homer earns. Bart declares that he wants to be a nuclear safety inspector like his father, but while he is at the power plant the next day, a janitor tells him that Homer's job does not exist for the current generation. Through song, the janitor explains the build-up and eventual decline of the middle class, and Lisa raps on how higher standards in education and rising cost of student loans will stop Bart from taking over Homer's position.

Bart then argues that he can make a living through selling cryptocurrency or as a social media influencer, but the janitor finds it unlikely. Various elderly residents of Springfield complain about their bad political candidates, whom they vote for due to fearmongering on social media. Bart gives up and accepts that he has no future, but the janitor follows him to his treehouse and implores him to burn the system and reform it, which Bart takes literally by taking off his clothes and throwing them onto a barbecue grill. As the treehouse goes up in flames, Bart fearfully admits that he does want to live to see the future. He is rescued by some firemen, who tell him about their job benefits and security. Bart then realizes that his true future is in firefighting, as there will always be fires in the world for him to put out.

During the credits, Homer and Marge discuss their bewilderment over the episode's musical nature, and contemplate using their home insurance payout to renovate their charred backyard, only to be informed by Lisa that their homeowners' policy does not cover musical numbers.

Production
The storyline of the episode is inspired by Dani Alexis Ryskamp's article "The Life in The Simpsons Is No Longer Attainable" published by The Atlantic, which was based on a Twitter thread by Erika Chappell.

"Poorhouse Rock" is the last episode on which Chris Ledesma collaborated as music editor. Ledesma has edited every previous episode of The Simpsons.

The couch gag was designed by Spiker Monster, a Venezuelan fan artist who received attention from the show's staff on Twitter for his fan webcomic "Those Springfield Kids" and creating artwork in response to every episode of the season.

Reception
Tony Sokol of Den of Geek gave the episode a 4 out of 5 stars stating "The Simpsons have reclaimed their anti-establishment roots. The treehouse is a metaphor. While it probably won't interrupt the annual 'Treehouse of Horror' episodes, it is traumatically far more frightening. The season finale finishes a dance which started when Matt Selman began calling the tunes. Season 33 opened with a musical, 'The Star of the Backstage', and ends with a mic drop."

Marcus Gibson of Bubbleblabber gave the episode an 7.5/10 stating,"Overall, 'Poorhouse Rock' doesn't have enough songs to be considered a musical, and its themes struggle to match the perkiness of its melody. However, it has enough moments in its plot and comedy to provide an enjoyable tuneful trip through the world of economics. The humor involving a 'Bridgerton' rip-off was a decent distraction until it gets to the 'Schoolhouse Rock' parody in the second half. The inclusion of a singing Hugh Jackman also makes this season finale a melodic treat for people who enjoyed his harmonious talents. This season is full of ups and downs, and I'm glad to see that it ended on an optimistic and humorous note rather than a sour one."

References

External links
 The Life in The Simpsons Is No Longer Attainable

2022 American television episodes
The Simpsons (season 33) episodes
Musical television episodes
Criticism of capitalism
Television episodes about social class